The Mar Thoma Syrian Church at Cheppad established in the last decade of the 19th century as a result of the purification movement or in Malayalam Naveekaranam/Shucheekaranam in the Malankara Church. It was against the theological teachings that came into the Syrian church due to the Roman Catholic rule and influence.

History
It was founded in 1894 as a result of the movement initiated by Kannampallil Koshy Mathai Kathanar who was the Senior Vicar in the Cheppad Malankara Church (St. George Orthodox Church, Cheppad) by the approval of the then Metropolitan, Titus I Mar Thoma (1893–1910). This church holds a unique position in the church history of the Syrian Christians of malankara. During the koodasha of this church all the episcopas, the sufragun metropolitan and the then Malankara metropolitan was present. Even though it is a reformed church, the worship and culture of the Mar Thoma Christians here are deeply rooted in the eastern oriental culture which is greatly acknowledged throughout the Mar Thoma Syrian Church. The church is known for its beautiful madbaha and its architectural beauty.

References

External links
 Official Website

Churches in Alappuzha district
Malankara Orthodox Syrian church buildings
Churches in Cheppad